Kholmsky District is an administrative district (raion) of Sakhalin Oblast, Russia; one of the seventeen in the oblast. Municipally, it is incorporated as Kholmsky Urban Okrug. It is located in the southwest of the oblast. Its administrative center is the town of Kholmsk. Population (excluding the administrative center):

References

Notes

Sources

Districts of Sakhalin Oblast